Chris Cole may refer to:

Chris Cole (politician) (born 1964), North Carolina Libertarian activist
Chris Cole (skateboarder) (born 1982), professional skateboarder
Chris Cole (American football) (born 1977), NFL wide receiver
Chris Cole (soccer) (born 1995), American soccer player
Christina Cole (born 1982), also known as Chris Cole, English actress
Chris Cole, the main character in the 2001 film Rock Star, played by Mark Wahlberg

See also
Christopher Cole (disambiguation)